No Exit is the fourth studio album by progressive metal band Fates Warning, released in 1988 through Metal Blade Records. It is the first Fates Warning album to feature current singer Ray Alder, who replaced John Arch after the release of Awaken the Guardian (1986), as well as the last to feature drummer Steve Zimmerman, who left the band just prior to the recording of their subsequent album Perfect Symmetry (1989). The album's title was inspired by No Exit, a 1944 play written by French philosopher Jean-Paul Sartre.

Music and style
Musically, No Exit is fairly similar to the band's previous efforts, although incorporating more elements of thrash metal while still maintaining the complex structures and powerful vocal performances found in the earlier albums. Although the lyrics are less influenced by fantasy themes which were predominant in the earlier albums, the philosophical element is still present.

Reissues
No Exit has had two major reissues. The first was in 1992 as part of a double album with Awaken the Guardian. The second was a remastered edition containing three bonus tracks and a DVD of live material, released on September 4, 2007 to coincide with Metal Blade's 25th anniversary.

Reception

Eduardo Rivadavia at AllMusic gave No Exit four stars out of five, saying "Usually regarded as the finest release from Fates Warning's early years, when their progressive leanings were tempered with no small amount of classic metal riffing, No Exit is a typically difficult album to come to grips with." The album reached No. 111 on the U.S. Billboard 200 and remained on that chart for thirteen weeks, longer than any of the band's albums before or since. In a 2007 article by IGN, it was ranked No. 14 on their list of "Top 25 Metal Albums".

Track listing

Personnel
Ray Alder – vocals, arrangement
Jim Matheos – guitar, arrangement
Frank Aresti – guitar, arrangement
Mark Castiglione – keyboard
Steve Zimmerman – drums, percussion, arrangement
Joe DiBiase – bass, arrangement
Phil Magnotti – engineering, mixing
Roger Probert – mixing, production
Max Norman – mixing, executive production

Chart performance

References

External links
Fates Warning: No Exit (25th Anniversary Remastered Edition) at Sea of Tranquility

Fates Warning albums
1988 albums
Metal Blade Records albums